Taiwanese tea culture includes tea arts, traditional tea ceremonies, and the social aspects of tea consumption in Taiwan. It can be traced back to its roots in Chinese tea culture. Many of the classical arts can be seen in the tea culture, such as calligraphy, flower arts, and incense arts. Tea, especially oolong tea, is a popular drink in Taiwan, and teahouses, or "tea-arts" shops, are common.

History
The roots of Taiwanese tea culture are Chinese however the climate and the landscape have led to the development of a unique tea culture. In particular development has been spurred by the high mountains.

The island country's tea arts are Chinese that have been influenced by western culture. Gongfu tea ceremony is informally referred to as laoren cha, or "old man tea", which originated in China and has flourished in Taiwan.

Traditionally emphasis has been placed on single-origin teas but in the 21st century high-quality blended teas gained prominence. Traditional xun tea making, that is making tea from dried petals or stamen of flowers, has also experienced a resurgence.

Tea culture and studies education
Tatung Institute of Commerce and Technology
Lu-Yu Tea Culture Institute
Tea Research and Extension Station

See also
Bubble tea, invented in Taiwan
Chinese tea culture
Gongfu tea ceremony
Japanese tea ceremony
Hong Kong tea culture
Taiwanese cuisine
Taiwanese tea

References

Chinese tea culture
Culture